Henry Martin (21 December 1763 – 19 July 1839) was a Member of Parliament. He represented the constituency of Kinsale from 29 April 1806 to 27 June 1818.

Martin owned the estate village of Colston Bassett and was responsible for the building of several larger houses including the rectory.

He died on 19 July 1839, aged seventy-five.

References

External links 
 

1763 births
1839 deaths
Members of the Parliament of the United Kingdom for County Cork constituencies (1801–1922)
UK MPs 1802–1806
UK MPs 1806–1807
UK MPs 1807–1812
UK MPs 1812–1818
People from Rushcliffe (district)